Jarrod Hanks (born July 28, 1969) is a retired American gymnast.  he first began gymnastics in 1977. Hanks was a member of the 1991 and 1992 World Championship squads.  He did not make it to the 1992 Olympics, placing 9th all-around at the Trials.

Hanks competed for the University of Oklahoma and was the 1992 Nissen Award winner (the "Heisman" of gymnastics).

Personal life
Hanks is married to singer and entertainer Heather Whittall, from Winter Park, Florida. After retiring, Hanks became a stuntman at Disney World. 2002, Hanks had his first daughter. 2004, Hanks had his second daughter. 2011, Hanks had his third daughter.

Competition

International Competition
1996 Budget Rent a Car Gymnastics Invitational USA vs. France, Miami, Fla.; 1st-Team
1993 Puerto Rico Cup, Puerto Rico; 1st-AA & FX & PH & SR
1992 World Gymnastics Championships, Paris, France; advanced to semi-finals-9th-FX, 13th-PH
1992 Dodge Challenge: USA vs. Japan, Phoenix, Ariz.; 1st-Team, 2nd-AA
1992 McDonald's International Mixed Pairs, Tallahassee, Fla.; 4th-AA (with Kim Zmeskal)
1992 McDonald's American Cup, Orlando, Fla.; 1st-AA
1991 Tokyo Cup, Tokyo, Japan; 1st(t)-HB, 3rd-FX & PH
1991 Chunichi Cup, Nagoya City, Japan; 5th(t)-AA, 4th-FX, 5th-V, 6th-PH & HB, 7th-SR, 8th PB
1991 World Gymnastics Championships, Indianapolis, Ind.; 5th-Team, 16th-AA
1991 Pre-Olympic Meet, Barcelona, Spain; 2nd-Team, 15th-AA, 8th-PH
1990 The Pyramid Challenge: USA vs. GDR, Memphis, Tenn.; 9th-AA, 2nd(t)-HB
1987 USA vs. Australia, Colorado Springs, Colo.

National Competition
1996 Winter Cup Challenge, Colorado Springs, Colo.; 13th-AA
1995 World Team Trials, Austin, Texas; 14th-AA
1995 Coca-Cola National Championships, New Orleans, La.; 7th-AA, 3rd-SR, 4th-FX & PB
1994 Coca-Cola National Championships, Nashville, Tenn.; 11th-AA, 5th-FX, 2nd-PH
1994 Winter Cup Challenge, Colorado Springs, Colo.; 15th-AA (Compulsories) (injured—did not finish competition)
1993 Coca-Cola National Championships, Salt Lake City, Utah; 5th-AA, 3rd-FX, 5th-PH, 4th-PB
1993 World University Games Trials, Colorado Springs, Colo.; 6th-AA
1992 U.S. Olympic Trials, Baltimore, Md.; 9th-AA
1992 U.S. Gymnastics Championships, Columbus, Ohio; 9th-AA, 3rd-PH
1992 Winter Nationals, Colorado Springs, Colo.; 1st-AA
1991 U.S. Gymnastics Championships, Cincinnati, Ohio; 7th-AA, 2nd(t)-PH, 3rd-PB, 5th-HB
1991 NCAA Championships, University Park, Pa.; 1st-Team, 4th-AA, 4th-FX, 6th-SR, 7th-PB, 3rd-HB
1990 Winter Nationals, Colorado Springs, Colo.; Injured - did not compete
1990 U.S. Olympic Festival, Minneapolis, Minn.; 6th-AA
1990 U.S. Gymnastics Championships, Denver, Colo.; 15th-AA, 5th-PH
1990 NCAA Championships, Minneapolis, Minn.; 12th-AA, 5th(t)-FX, 7th(t)-SR
1989 Winter Nationals, Colorado Springs, Colo.; 12th-AA
1989 U.S. Olympic Festival, Oklahoma City, Okla.; 9th-AA, 6th-V
1989 U.S. Gymnastics Championships, Minneapolis, Minn.; 10th-AA
1988 Winter Nationals, Colorado Springs, Colo.; 18th-AA
1987 U.S. Olympic Sports Festival, Chapel Hill, N.C.; 16th-AA, 6th-HB
1987 McDonald's U.S. Gymnastics Championships, Kansas City, Mo.; 60th-AA

References

1969 births
Living people
Sportspeople from Lafayette, Louisiana
Oklahoma Sooners men's gymnasts
American male artistic gymnasts
20th-century American people